Md. Jan Higher Secondary School was founded in 1933 in Kolkata, India, by Janab Khan Bahadur Al-Haj Sheikh Md.Jan.

About School
The school was started with the namel Calcutta Muslim High School at Ram Lochan Mallick Street,(Phal Mandi of Machua Bazar), Kolkata. After that it was shifted to its present address at 9B, Bolai Dutta Street, Kolkata -700073. The school become co-education from 2008. It has Morning Girl shift and Day Boy shift.

See also
Education in India
List of schools in India
Education in West Bengal

References

External links

High schools and secondary schools in Kolkata
Educational institutions established in 1933
1933 establishments in India